The 2018 Pacific Handball Cup is a multi venue Handball tournament featuring countries based on the Pacific Ocean from April to December 2018. This will be the first tournament since 2006 and the first to feature countries from the American continent.

The first leg was carried out in Mexico during April. The other legs will be completed by October with the finals to be held on Hawaii in December.

The championships were abandoned, as the Oceania teams concentrated on the 2018 Oceania Men's Handball Challenge Trophy and both the Australian Women's and New Zealand women's team's playing in the 2018 Asian Women's Handball Championship. The Vanuatu Handball Association was also recovering from the October 2015 earthquake.

Fixtures

Pool A - America's

All times are local (UTC−05:00).

Pool B - Oceania

Pool C - French Pacific

Playoffs

Finals

4th - 6th playoff

7th - 9th playoff

See also
 Pacific Handball Cup
 Oceania Continent Handball Federation
 Pan-American Team Handball Federation

References

External links
 International Handball Federation webpage
 Pan-American Handball Federation (Spanish)

Pacific Handball Cup
Pacific Handball Cup